Zachary Vlahos (born August 19, 1988) is an American rower. He competed in the Men's eight event at the 2012 Summer Olympics.

References

External links
 

1988 births
Living people
American male rowers
Olympic rowers of the United States
Rowers at the 2012 Summer Olympics
Sportspeople from New York City
World Rowing Championships medalists for the United States